For One Night Only is an album by British rock band Terrorvision, released in 2005.

The album documents what, at that time, was assumed to be one of the last live performances of the group. It was recorded live at the London Kentish Town Forum on April 15, 2005. The band later reformed in 2007, and have played many shows since.

It was released by Secret Records.

A DVD of the same performance was released on 7 February 2007.

Track listing
Enteralterego 
D'Ya Wanna Go Faster?
Josephine
Friends & Family 
Alice What's The Matter 
American TV 
Stop The Bus 
Still The Rhythm 
Some People Say 
My House 
Celebrity Hit List 
Fist Of Fury 
What Makes You Tick 
Dog Chewed The Handle 
Bad Actress 
Middleman
Tequila
Pretend Best Friend 
Oblivion
Discothèque Wreck 
Perseverance

2005 live albums
Terrorvision albums